The Alywow Stakes is a Canadian Thoroughbred horse race run annually during the second week of June at Woodbine Racetrack in Toronto, Ontario. Open to three-year-old fillies, the overnight stakes race is contested on turf over a distance of  furlongs.

Inaugurated in 2002, the race is named for the filly Alywow who died that year. Alywow was the 1994 Canadian Champion Three-Year-Old Filly and Horse of the Year. She was inducted in the Canadian Horse Racing Hall of Fame in 2009.

Records
Speed  record:
 1:14.39 - Passion (2008)

Most wins by an owner:
 No owner has won this race more than once.

Most wins by a jockey:
 4 - Patrick Husbands (2007, 2010, 2011, 2012)

Most wins by a trainer:
 3 - Mark E. Casse (2007, 2012, 2015)
 2 - Mark Frostad (2005, 2011)

Winners

References
 The 2008 Alywow Stakes at Woodbine Entertainment Group
 The 2009 Alywow Stakes at Horse-races.net

Ungraded stakes races in Canada
Turf races in Canada
Flat horse races for three-year-old fillies
Woodbine Racetrack
Recurring sporting events established in 2002